Baddeck is a village in northeastern Nova Scotia, Canada. It is situated in the centre of Cape Breton, approximately 6 km east of where the Baddeck River empties into Bras d'Or Lake.

Local governance is provided by the rural municipality of Victoria County, with an elected village council having limited authority. The population was 826 in the 2016 Canadian census.

It was first settled by United Empire Loyalists in the late 18th century, and prospered in the 19th century with mining, milling, and shipbuilding. Today the economy depends on services, cultural activities, and tourism.

Toponymy
Baddeck is one of the few Nova Scotian Mi'kmaq language place names that was not replaced by colonial settlers. The French called it La Bedeque, while Canadian Gaelic speakers called it Badaig. Its original meaning has been variously reported as "reversing flow", "place with island near" (a likely reference to Kidston Island), "a portion of food set aside for someone", or "a sultry place".

History

French Jesuits settled at nearby St. Anns in 1629. British settlement came during the 1700s after the territory was ceded by France.

In 1839, a property containing an inn, a tavern, and a post office was built. In 1841, Charles James Campbell opened a store began shipbuilding, and developed coal mining.

In 1851 Victoria County was split off from Cape Breton county and Baddeck became the site for the new county's jail and court house.

Baddeck rose to fame in 1874, with the publication of the travel memoir Baddeck, And That Sort of Thing.

In 1885 the Alexander Graham Bell family had a vacation in Baddeck. He then built a complex of buildings, including a new laboratory, named Beinn Bhreagh (Gaelic: beautiful mountain) after Bell's ancestral Scottish highlands. Initially a summer residence, Bell spent an increasing part of the year there, and conducted many experiments, including the AEA Silver Dart's first controlled powered flight in Canada in 1909. From 1885 to 1928 the estate included the Bell Boatyard which made both experimental and traditional boats. The yard was notable for its dual focus on both experimental and traditional boats and for its employment of large numbers of female boatbuilders.

Bell is commemorated at the Alexander Graham Bell National Historic Site.

Geography
The area sits on rocks from the Carboniferous Windsor Group. These include rock salt, limestone, potash, and gypsum, which are easily dissolved by groundwater and creates caves and sinkholes.

Climate 
Baddeck experiences a humid continental climate (Dfb).

Demographics 

Attractions 
Baddeck is one of several Cape Breton communities that plays host to the Celtic Colours festival each fall. The music festival features hundreds of Celtic musicians from Cape Breton and around the world.

In the spring, the village hosts the Cabot Trail Relay Race, a 298 km (185-mile) relay race around the Cabot Trail.

The Cabot Trail, a scenic route, passes through Baddeck.

Historic structures in the town include:
 Telegraph House hotel, 1861, first came to prominence after it was featured in the 1874 book Baddeck, And That Sort of Thing. It once housed the Trans-Oceanic Cable Company, a pioneer in telegraphy.
 Saint Peter's and Saint John's Anglican Church, 1883, wooden Gothic Revival church.
 Gilbert H. Grosvenor Hall, 1886, Romanesque Revival structure of local red sandstone, originally built as the Baddeck Post Office and Custom House.
 Victoria County Court House, 1889, Neoclassical wood and granite building.
 Bras d'Or House, circa 1894, heavily remodelled, now houses apartments and a Chinese restaurant.
 St. Mark's Masonic Lodge, 1898, built in the style of a church, featuring elaborate architectural and Masonic details, many of which now covered with vinyl siding.
 Kidston Island Lighthouse, 1912, accessible by ferry in the summer.

Education
Baddeck Academy: primary to grade 12 school serving Baddeck and the surrounding communities.

Services 

 Bras d'Or Yacht Club
 Bell Bay Golf Club
 Baddeck (Guneden) Aerodrome

See also 
 People from Baddeck

Gallery

References

External links 

Villages in Nova Scotia
Communities in Victoria County, Nova Scotia
Designated places in Nova Scotia